In mathematics, Charlier polynomials (also called Poisson–Charlier polynomials) are a family of orthogonal polynomials introduced by Carl Charlier.
They are given in terms of the generalized hypergeometric function by

where  are generalized Laguerre polynomials. They satisfy the orthogonality relation

They form a Sheffer sequence related to the Poisson process, similar to how Hermite polynomials relate to the Brownian motion.

See also 
 Wilson polynomials, a generalization of Charlier polynomials.

References 
 C. V. L. Charlier (1905–1906) Über die Darstellung willkürlicher Funktionen, Ark. Mat. Astr. och Fysic 2, 20.
 
 

Orthogonal polynomials